Trimethylolpropane phosphite, C2H5C(CH2O)3P, is a phosphite ester used as a ligand in organometallic chemistry. Trimethylolpropane phosphite is sometimes abbreviated to EtCage. It is a white solid that is soluble in organic solvents. It is also highly toxic.

Preparation and reactions
It is prepared by reaction of trimethylolpropane with phosphorus trichloride or by transesterification with trimethylphosphite:
P(OMe)3 + EtC(CH2OH)3 → 3 MeOH + EtC(CH2O)3P
The first member of this series was derived from trimethylolethane, but these derivatives are often poorly soluble.  For this reason, the ethyl derivative has received more attention.

Reactions
The compound forms an isolable ozonide, which degrades above 0 °C to release singlet O2.

Coordination chemistry
Several EtCage complexes are known, since the ligand is highly basic (for a phosphite) and has a small ligand cone angle (101°). Illustrative complexes include [(EtCage)2Mo(CO)4], [Ir4(CO)11(EtCage)] and (CpMe5)RuCl(EtCage)2, shown below.

Safety
Trimethylolpropane phosphite is very toxic and is a convulsant. LD50 is 1.1 mg per kg bodyweight (mice, i.p.).

References

Organophosphites
Convulsants
GABAA receptor negative allosteric modulators